Ureaplasma urealyticum is a bacterium belonging to the genus Ureaplasma and the family Mycoplasmataceae in the order Mycoplasmatales. This family consists of the genera Mycoplasma and Ureaplasma. Its type strain is T960. There are two known biovars of this species; T960 and 27.  These strains of bacteria are commonly found as commensals in the urogenital tracts of human beings, but overgrowth can lead to infections that cause the patient discomfort. Unlike most bacteria, Ureaplasma urealyticum lacks a cell wall making it unique in physiology and medical treatment.

Classification
The six recognised Ureaplasma species have a GC content of 27 to 30 percent and a genome size ranging from 0.76 to 1.17 million base pairs, and cholesterol is required for growth. A defining characteristic of the genus is that they perform urea hydrolysis, which creates ammonia as a product. Some strains originally classified as U. urealyticum should be treated as a new species, U. parvum. Both strains of Ureaplasma urealyticum have had their DNA sequenced, using a PCR amplification and dideoxy termination method. Their sequences can be accessed through public records and databases. Most of the16S rDNA sequence of the two strains constitute the exact same nucleotides bases (97.3% homology), yet small differences have been acknowledged. Due to the direct similarity and the increased variation in other species of Ureaplasma, it is thought that the two strains of Ureaplasma urealyticum (T960 and 27) have evolutionary diverged together. In the same study conducted, using the same 16s rDNA aligned sequences, they concluded all the mammalian strains diverged and coevolved with their corresponding species (canine, feline, human, bovine) during the Cretaceous period. It was found that the most closely related species strain of Ureaplasma to Ureaplasma urealyticum was Ureaplasma diversum (isolated from bovine).

Clinical relevance

Ureaplasma urealyticum can cause urethritis and may cause bacterial vaginosis. Infection can occur in extragenital sites. A common symptom associated with these infections is the "fishy" smell that is created due to the production of ammonia by the hydrolysis of urea. Patients should confirm diagnosis with a doctor. The bacterium has high correlations with the Human Papillomavirus (HPV). It has also been linked to infertility in both males and females.  In addition, this pathogen may latently infect the chorionic villi tissues of pregnant women, thereby impacting pregnancy outcome. Issues that arise from Ureaplasma urealyticum infections during pregnancy include preterm birth and impacted embryonic development. Some patients have given birth to children subjected to bronchopulmonary dysplasia, Intraventricular hemorrhage, and necrotizing enterocolitis. Patients can evolve resistances to normal antibiotic treatments due to the distinctive physiology of these organisms. Patients who are pregnant have further limitations on the treatment course of a Ureaplasma urealyticum infection, making it far harder to successfully cure.

See also
 International Organization for Mycoplasmology (IOM)
 Sexually transmitted disease
 Vaginal infection
 Vaginal disease
 Vaginal health
 List of bacterial vaginosis microbiota
 Uterine microbiome
 Mycoplasma

References

External links
 
 Ureaplasma Genome Projects from Genomes OnLine Database
 Type strain of Ureaplasma urealyticum at BacDive -  the Bacterial Diversity Metadatabase

urealyticum
Sexually transmitted diseases and infections
Infectious causes of cancer
Infections with a predominantly sexual mode of transmission
Bacterial vaginosis
Bacteria described in 1974